Indophanus dakshinus is a species of beetle in the family Silvanidae, the only species in the genus Indophanus.

References

Silvanidae genera
Monotypic Cucujoidea genera